Thrayambakam is a 2019 Indian Kannada-language psychological thriller directed by Dayal Padmanabhan and starring Raghavendra Rajkumar, Anupama Gowda, and RJ Rohith. The film is about a father and a daughter.

Cast 
Raghavendra Rajkumar as  Shiva Rudriah
Anupama Gowda as Namana
 RJ Rohith

Production 
The film began shooting in late 2019 and started its dubbing stages in January 2019.

Soundtrack 
The songs are composed by R. S. Ganesh Narayanan. The acapella song "Moda Modalu" was released in early 2019 and is considered the first acapella song in the Kannada film industry.

Release 
The Times of India gave the film a rating of two-and-a-half out of five stars and stated that "Thryambakam is an earnest effort, but it could have been trimmed in the first half". International Business Times gave the film the same rating and wrote that "The idea and narration are fresh as Dayal tries to build a different perception about the situation that the main character is going through". The Bangalore Mirror gave the film a rating of two out of five stars and wrote that "Tryambakam does not offer much of a cinematic experience".

References

External links 

Indian psychological thriller films
2019 psychological thriller films
2010s Kannada-language films